Halarchon is a genus of flowering plants belonging to the family Amaranthaceae.

Its native range is Afghanistan.

Species:
 Halarchon vesiculosus Bunge

References

Amaranthaceae
Amaranthaceae genera
Taxa named by Alexander von Bunge